Belo Pole can refer to:
 Belo Pole, Blagoevgrad Province, Bulgaria
 Belo Pole, Vidin Province, Bulgaria
 Belo Pole, Dolneni, North Macedonia

See also
Belo Polje (disambiguation)
Bijelo Polje, a town and municipality in northern Montenegro